Obesotoma sachalinensis is a species of sea snail, a marine gastropod mollusk in the family Mangeliidae.

Description
The length of the shell varies between 16 mm and 21 mm.

Distribution
This species occurs in the Sea of Okhotsk.

References

 Bogdanov, I.P. (1989a) Five new Japan Sea species of Oenopotinae (Gastropoda, Turridae). Zoological Journal, 68 (9) : 134–138. [in Russian].
 Okhotsk, Sea, et al. "Seven new species of subfamily Oenopotinae from the Okhotsk sea."

External links
  Tucker, J.K. 2004 Catalog of recent and fossil turrids (Mollusca: Gastropoda). Zootaxa 682:1-1295.

sachalinensis
Gastropods described in 1989